Tamta Shengelia (born 31 October 1996) is a Georgian footballer who plays as a forward and has appeared for the Georgia women's national team.

Career
Shengelia has been capped for the Georgia national team, appearing for the team during the 2019 FIFA Women's World Cup qualifying cycle.

References

External links
 
 
 

1996 births
Living people
Women's footballers from Georgia (country)
Georgia (country) women's international footballers
Women's association football forwards
FC Martve players